Airline Partners Australia (APA) is a consortium that made a A$5.45 per share takeover offer for Australian airline Qantas in December 2006.  The takeover offer received the endorsement of the Qantas board in the absence of a better offer, however the proposed takeover failed to gain the required level of shareholder support, despite the extension of deadlines and reduction in requirements for acceptance.

Company information
The consortium, comprising Texas Pacific Group, Macquarie Bank, Allco Finance Group, Allco Equity Partners and Onex Corporation, was structured to comply with strict Australian ownership laws for Qantas (which must be at least 51% owned by Australians).

Takeover bid
The initial proposal at $5.50 per share was rejected. The revised proposal followed negotiations with APA since the Board's rejection of its initial proposal. These negotiations resulted in the removal of unacceptable conditions and a substantial break fee as well as an increase in the price from $5.50 to $5.60 per share.

Margaret Jackson (Chairman) said the proposal provided an attractive premium for Qantas shareholders, being 33 percent higher than the closing share price of $4.20 on 6 November 2006, the day before the first speculation about the offer; and 61 percent above Qantas' volume weighted average share price of $3.48 over the six months to that date. 

Under the terms of the offer, the interim dividend that would otherwise have been payable in April 2007 would not be available. The Board decided that a fully franked special dividend could be paid during the bid period, in which case the offer consideration would be reduced by the dividend amount.

The takeover bid endorsed the existing management and structure of Qantas.  The initial bid required 70% shareholder approval, however this was later reduced to 50%.  Airline Partners Australia initially announced that it had failed in its bid for Qantas, having gained approval from only 46.5% of the company, when the offer closed at 7.00pm (Sydney Time) on Friday 4 May 2007.

Later that evening, however, APA received an acceptance from an additional 4.96% of Qantas shares, held by a Samuel J. Heyman's hedge fund. This acceptance that would have taken the acceptance level above 50% and therefore allowed the bid to succeed. APA appealed to the Australian Takeovers Panel in an attempt to have that acceptance included. However, on Sunday 6 May 2007, the Takeovers Panel ruled that Airline Partners Australia did not have the minimum holding required at 7.00pm, Friday 4 May, as stipulated in the bid. They also saw no sufficient basis to re-open the bid.

Some fortnight later, after continued speculation of another takeover offer, APA issued a press release announcing that:

"APA has concluded that in the current environment and circumstances, a renewed offer on terms acceptable to APA would not be likely to succeed... On that basis APA has decided not to proceed with a renewed offer for Qantas at this time. APA thanks Qantas' board, management and employees for their professionalism during the bid process and wishes Qantas every success for the future."

Takeover concerns
Numerous concerns were raised in relation to the proposed takeover.  These included Macquarie Bank's controlling stake in Sydney Airport (Australia's largest airport). There was concern that Macquarie Bank, being a major shareholder in both Qantas and Sydney Airport, would have incentive to place restrictions on commercial competitors using Sydney Airport, or favour Qantas in business dealings.

Airline unions raised concerns about the proposed takeover, amidst concerns that there would be heavy redundancies, or high numbers of jobs sent offshore.

Aftermath
The failed takeover bid caused concern amongst shareholders as to the ongoing viability of the Qantas board, which had recommended that shareholders accept the offer.

References

External links
 Official website

Defunct companies of Australia